Kyustendil Province (trl Oblast Kyustendil) is a province in southwestern Bulgaria, extending over an area of  (constituting 2.7% of the total territory of the Republic of Bulgaria), and with a population of 163,889.  It borders on the provinces of Sofia, Pernik, and Blagoevgrad; to the west, its limits coincide with the state borders between Bulgaria and North Macedonia, and between Bulgaria and the Republic of Serbia.  The administrative center of the Province is Kyustendil.

Geography
The region features diverse surface relief — fertile valleys and canyons, separated by hillocks and mountains. The northern and western parts of the territory form the so-called "Kyustendilsko kraishte" (Kyustendil Cornerland) and include parts of the cross-border Milevska, Chudinska, Zemenska and — to the east — Konyavska mountains. To the south, the Kyustendilsko kraishte reaches as far as the valleys of the Dragovishtitsa and Bistritsa rivers, as well as the Lisets mountain. The southern part of the region includes massifs of the Osogovo, Vlahina and northwestern Rila mountains, embracing the Kamenitsa, Kyustendil and Dupnitsa lowerlands.

The region is divided in two under-districts: Kyustendil in west and Dupnitsa in east. In Dupnitsa region there are the geographic areas of Gorno pole (Upper field), Dolno pole (Lower field), and the area Razmetanitsa where the Emperor Samuil of Bulgaria killed his brother Aron and his family.

The region abounds with granites, clays, fossils, and ores. Polymetal ores are excavated in Osogovo; brown coals in the Bobov dol mines. Clays deposits are located at the villages of Chetirtsi, Yahinovo and Dragovishtitsa. The region, however, is most famous for its numerous mineral water springs: hot mineral water springs in Kyustendil, Sapareva banya, the villages of Nevestino and Chetirtsi. A marvel of nature, found in the region are the Stobski piramidi (Stob pyramids).

For the most part, the climate is transcontinental, but at higher altitudes it is mountainous. The main drainage river is Struma whose subsidiaries are the Treklyanska, Dragovishtitsa, Bistritsa, Slokoshtitsa, Novoselska, Dzherman and Rila rivers. Subterranean water levels are relatively high. Near the village of Kamenichka Skakavitsa, the Golemi dol river forms a 70-meter-high waterfall. The Dyakovo, Bersin, Drenov dol and Bagrentsi artificial lakes (dams) are chiefly used for irrigation purposes. Soil composition is most favorable for the traditionally developed fruit-growing.

Forest vegetation is mostly deciduous, although coniferous forests are present. The Gabra natural reservation (area: 89,5 metric hektares) houses the last remaining black-pine trees.

Administration

The region of Kyustendil includes nine municipalities with 182 settlements. The regional administrative center is the town of Kyustendil situated in its southwestern part: the Kyustendil lowerland. Four main transport routes pass through Kyustendil: from North Macedonia on the Skopie-Sofia high-way; from Serbia on the Niš-Bosilegrad-Kyustendil highway; through Dupnitsa and Kyustendil passes the oldest commercial road that for centuries has linked Constantinople and the Adriatic Sea. Kyustendil has managed to preserve is historical, ecological and cultural heritage. It is a contemporary Bulgarian administrative center, whose future is mostly seen in the development of cultural tourism, and modern rehabilitation resort centers by the hot mineral water springs.

The surrounding region is like an untapped national park. Wander through green lanes past medieval houses and barns and discover stunning landscapes. Plenty of fishing, walking, trekking, 4*4 country, hunting, with clear air and a fantastic climate.

Municipalities

The Kyustendil province (област, oblast) contains nine municipalities (singular: община, obshtina, plural: общини, obshtini). The following table shows the names of each municipality in English and Cyrillic, the main town (in bold) or village, and the population as of 2009.

Demographics

The following table represents the change of the population in the province after World War II:

Ethnic groups

Total population (2011 census):  136 686
Ethnic groups (2011 census):

Of 130,615 persons:
Bulgarians:  121 351 (92,91%)
Romani: 8 305 (6,36% )
Others and indefinable: 959 (0,73%)

Ethnic groups in the province according to 2001 census:
Bulgarians: 152,644
Romani: 8 294
Others and indefinable: 1596

Most of the Gypsies live within the city limits of Kyustendil, the provincial center of Bulgaria with largest concentration of Gypsies, where they are 5,179, constituting 12.2% of the population. Most of the rest are to be found in the second largest city of Dupnitsa, where they are 2,333.

Language

Mother tongues in the province according to 2001 census:

 153,242 Bulgarian
 7,929 Romani
 1363 others and unspecified

Religion

Religious adherence in the province according to 2001 census:

See also

Provinces of Bulgaria
Municipalities of Bulgaria
List of cities and towns in Bulgaria
List of villages in Kyustendil Province

References

External links

 
Provinces of Bulgaria